A tank locomotive or tank engine is a steam locomotive that carries its water in one or more on-board water tanks, instead of a more traditional tender. Most tank engines also have bunkers (or fuel tanks) to hold fuel; in a tender-tank locomotive a tender holds some or all of the fuel, and may hold some water also.

There are several different types of tank locomotive, distinguished by the position and style of the water tanks and fuel bunkers. The most common type has tanks mounted either side of the boiler. This type originated about 1840 and quickly became popular for industrial tasks, and later for shunting and shorter-distance main line duties. 

Tank locomotives have advantages and disadvantages compared to traditional locomotives that required a separate tender to carry needed water and fuel.

History

Origins 

The first tank locomotive was the Novelty that ran at the Rainhill Trials in 1829. It was an example of a Well Tank. However, the more common form of Side tank date from the 1840s; one of the first of these was supplied by George England and Co. of New Cross to the contractors building the Seaford branch line for the London Brighton and South Coast Railway in 1848. In spite of the early belief that such locomotives were inherently unsafe, the idea quickly caught on, particularly for industrial use and five manufacturers exhibited designs at The Great Exhibition in 1851. These were E. B. Wilson and Company, William Fairbairn & Sons, George England, Kitson Thompson and Hewitson and William Bridges Adams. By the mid-1850s tank locomotives were to be found performing a variety of main line and industrial roles, particularly those involving shorter journeys or frequent changes in direction.

Types of tank locomotive 
There are a number of types of tank locomotive, based on the location and style of the water tanks. These include the side tank, the saddle tank, the pannier tank, the well tank and others.

Side tank
Side tanks are cuboid-shaped tanks which are situated on both sides of the boiler, extending all or part of the boiler's length. The tank sides extend down to the running platform, if such is present, for at least part of their length. This was a common configuration in the UK.

The length of side tanks was often limited in order to give access to the valve gear (inside motion). Tanks that ran the full length of the boiler provided greater water capacity and, in this case, cut-outs in the rectangular tank gave access to the valve gear. Longer side tanks were sometimes tapered downwards at the front to improve forward visibility. Side tanks almost all stopped at, or before, the end of the boiler barrel, with the smokebox protruding ahead. A few designs did reach to the front of the smokebox and these were termed 'flatirons'.

Saddle tank
The water tank sits on top of the boiler like a saddle sits atop a horse.  Usually, the tank is curved in cross-section, although in some cases there were straight sides surmounted by a curve (like an inverted 'U'), or even an ogee shape (a concave arc flowing into a convex arc). Walter Nielson patented the saddle tank arrangement in 1849.

Saddle tanks were a popular arrangement especially for smaller locomotives in industrial use. It gave a greater water supply, but limited the size of the boiler and restricted access to it for cleaning. Furthermore, the locomotive has a higher centre of gravity and hence must operate at lower speeds. The driver's vision may also be restricted, again restricting the safe speed.

The squared-off shape of the Belpaire firebox does not fit easily beneath a saddle tank, and so most saddle tanks retained the older round-topped boiler instead. A few American locomotives used saddle tanks that only covered the boiler barrel, forward of the firebox.

Water in the tank is slightly pre-heated by the boiler, which reduces the loss of pressure found when cold feedwater is injected into the boiler. However, if the water becomes too hot, injectors lose efficiency and can fail. For this reason, the tanks often stopped short of the hotter and uninsulated smokebox.

Pannier tank

Pannier tanks are box-shaped tanks carried on the sides of the boiler, similar to side tanks, but not going all the way down to the locomotive's running plates, leaving a space between each tank and the running plate. The pannier arrangement lowers the centre of gravity compared to a saddle tank, whilst still allowing easy access to the valve gear that the latter gave. Pannier tanks are so-named because of their positioning's similarity to the position of a pannier on a pack animal.

Usage

Britain 
In Britain, Pannier Tank locomotives were used almost exclusively by the Great Western Railway. The first Great Western pannier tanks were converted from saddle tank locomotives when these were being rebuilt in the early 1900s with the Belpaire firebox. There were difficulties in accommodating the flat top of the latter within an encircling saddle tank which cut down capacity and increased the tendency to overheat the water in the tank. Pannier tank locomotives are often seen as an icon of the GWR.

Belgium 

In Belgium, pannier tanks were in use at least since 1866, once again in conjunction with Belpaire firebox. Locomotives were built for the Belgian State and for la Société Générale d'Exploitatation (SGE), a private company grouping smaller secondary lines.

Well tank
In this design, used in earlier and smaller locomotives, the water is stored in a 'well' on the underside of the locomotive, generally between the locomotive's frames. This arrangement was patented by S.D. Davison in 1852. This does not restrict access to the boiler, but space is limited there, and the design is therefore not suitable for locomotives that need a good usable range before refilling. The arrangement does, however, have the advantage of creating a low centre of gravity, creating greater stability on poorly laid or narrow gauge tracks. The first tank locomotive, Novelty, was a well tank.

Rear tank (or back tank) 

In this design, the tank is placed behind the cab, usually over a supporting bogie. This removes the weight of the water from the driving wheels, giving the locomotive a constant tractive weight. The disadvantage is a reduction in water carrying capacity. A rear tank is an essential component of the American Forney type of locomotive, which is a 4-4-0 American-type with wheels reversed.

Wing tank 

Wing tanks are side tanks that run the length of the smokebox, instead of the full length of the boiler. In the early 19th century the term "wing tank" was sometimes used as a synonym for side tank.

Wing tanks were mainly used on narrow gauge industrial locomotives that could be frequently re-filled with water and where side or saddle tanks would restrict access to valve gear. The Kerry Tramway's locomotive Excelsior has been described, by various sources, as both a wing tank and an inverted saddle tank.

Inverted saddle tank 

The inverted saddle tank was a variation of the Wing Tank where the two tanks were joined underneath the smokebox and supported it. This rare design was used for the same reasons as the wing tank but provided slightly greater water capacity.  The Brill Tramway locomotive Wotton is believed to have had an inverted saddle tank.  The inverted saddle tank was a speciality of W.G.Bagnall.

Tender-tank 

A tank locomotive may also haul a tender behind it. This was the common arrangement on the largest locomotives, as well as on narrow gauge railways where the small size of the locomotive restricts the space available for fuel and water. These combined both fuel and water in a proportion (where coal was used) of 1 pound of coal for every 6 pounds of water..

Where a tender was used with a narrow-gauge locomotive it usually carried only fuel, with water carried in the locomotive's tanks. The tender offered greater fuel capacity than a bunker on the locomotive and often the water capacity could be increased by converting redundant bunker space into a water tank.

Combinations 

Large side tank engines might also have an additional rear tank (under the coal bunker), or a well tank (between the frames). This may have been to increase the water capacity, to equalise the weight distribution, or else improve the stability by lowering the centre of gravity.

Locomotive classification and wheel arrangement 
Because tank locomotives are capable of running equally fast in both directions (see below) they usually have symmetrical wheel arrangements to ensure the same ride and stability characteristics regardless of the direction travelled, producing arrangements with only driving wheels (e.g.  and ) or equal numbers of leading and trailing wheels (e.g.  and ).

Whyte classification 

In the Whyte notation for classification of locomotives (primarily by wheel arrangement), various suffixes are used to denote tank locomotives:

UIC classification 

In the UIC notation which also classifies locomotives primarily by wheel arrangement, the suffix 't' is used to denote tank locomotives

Fuel bunker 

On tank locomotives which use solid fuels such as coal, a bunker is used to carry the fuel (for locomotives using liquid fuel such as oil, a Fuel tank is used). There are two main positions for bunkers on tank locomotives: to the rear of the cab (as illustrated in the left of the images below), a position typically used on locomotives with a trailing carrying axle or a trailing bogie; or on top of and to one side of the firebox, a positioning typically used in cases where the firebox overhangs the rear driving axle, as this counterbalances the overhanging weight of the firebox, stabilising the locomotive.

Other types of tank locomotive 
There are several other specialised types of steam locomotive which carry their own fuel but which are usually categorised for different reasons.

Garratt locomotive 

A Garratt type of locomotive is articulated in three parts. The boiler is mounted on the centre frame without wheels, and two sets of driving wheels (4 cylinders total) carrying fuel bunkers and water tanks are mounted on separate frames, one on each end of the boiler. Articulation is used so larger locomotives can go around curves which would otherwise restrict the size of rigid framed locomotives. One of the major advantages of the Garratt form of articulation is the maintenance of the locomotive's centre-of-gravity over or inside the track centre-line when rounding curves.

Crane tank 

A crane tank (CT) is a steam tank locomotive fitted with a crane for working in railway workshops or other industrial environments. The crane may be fitted at the front, centre or rear.

Streamlined tank locomotives 

During the 1930s there was a trend for express passenger locomotives to be streamlined by enclosed bodyshells. Express locomotives were nearly all tender locomotives, but a few fast tank engines were also streamlined, for use on high-speed, but shorter, services where turn-around time was important and the tank engine's independence from turntables was useful. Examples included the German Class 61 and the Hungarian Class 242.

Contractor's locomotive 

The contractor's locomotive was a small tank locomotive specially adapted for use by civil engineering contractor firms engaged in the building of railways. The locomotives would be used for hauling men, equipment and building materials over temporary railway networks built at the worksite that were frequently re-laid or taken up and moved elsewhere as building work progressed. Contractor's locomotives were usually saddle or well tank types (see above) but required several adaptations to make them suitable for their task. They were built to be as light as possible so they could run over the lightly built temporary rails and had deeply flanged wheels so they did not de-rail on the tracks which were often very uneven.

At the same time, they had to be very powerful with good traction as they would often have to haul trains of wagons up very steep gradients, such as the sides of railway embankments or spoil heaps. Many were designed so that large iron ballast blocks could be fitted to the frames when extra weight and traction was required, then removed when it was not. Most had sanding gear fitted to all wheels for maximum traction. Some method of keeping mud and dust from clogging the wheels and brake shoes was also required – this either took the form of scraper bars fitted to the leading edge of the wheels or wheel washer jets supplied from the water tank. To handle long trains of loose-coupled (and often un-sprung) wagons, contractor's locomotives usually had very effective steam-powered brakes. Most lacked a full cab, often only having a front 'spectacle plate'. If a cab was provided it was usually removable along with the chimney, and sometimes the dome, so that the locomotive could be loaded onto a flatbed wagon for transport to new locations by rail whilst remaining within the loading gauge.

Steam tram engines 

Steam tram engines, which were built, or modified, to work on a street, or roadside, tramway were almost universally also tank engines.

Tram engines had their wheels and motion enclosed to avoid accidents in traffic. They often had cow catchers to avoid road debris causing a derailment. Some tram engines were fitted with a roof and enclosed sides, giving them an appearance more like a goods wagon than a locomotive.

Vertical boiler locomotives 

Railway locomotives with vertical boilers universally were tank locomotives. They were small, cheaper-to-operate machines mostly used in industrial settings.

Advantages and disadvantages 

The benefits of tank locomotives include:
 Bi-directionality: Most tank locomotives are capable of running at full speed in either direction (although this depends on the wheel arrangement; for example, a 2-6-0T will not be able to run as fast in reverse, due to lack of a trailing truck). Most tender locomotives are unable to do this, because the heavy tender is not designed to be pushed and may become unstable at higher speeds.  Tender locomotives generally require turning facilities, such as a turntable or wye, at each end of the run. A tank locomotive, on the other hand, can simply run around the train (provided there is a siding) and pull it back in the other direction.  The crew of a tank engine generally have a better view in the reverse direction than for a tender engine and are protected from the weather.
 Fuel and water add to adhesive weight: The usable tractive weight of a locomotive is the product of the weight on its driving wheels multiplied by the factor of adhesion.  Therefore, up to the limits of the maximum permissible axle loading, and other loading limits, the more weight on the driving wheels the better.  In a tank locomotive the weight of its own fuel and water increase the available tractive weight.
 Compactness: A tank locomotive is shorter than the equivalent tender locomotive.  This is important in environments with limited space for locomotives, such as the headshunt of a run-round loop.
 Efficiency: Many train tanks are designed to be in contact with, and be heated by, the boiler.  Pre-heated water will reach boiling point faster than the colder water available from a tender.  On the other hand, excessively hot water can interfere with steam injector operation and is to be avoided.

There are disadvantages:
 Limited fuel and water capacity: A tender can typically contain far more of both than is available on a tank locomotive.  This restricts the range of tank locomotives between fueling and watering points. This is one reason why tank engines were more popular in Europe and the UK than in America or other places, because the distances were shorter between refueling stations and water towers.
 Varying adhesive weight: As the water in the tanks is used up, the overall adhesive weight of the locomotive decreases, which in turn reduces the train weight the locomotive can pull. Locomotives with low water supplies also typically ride less well as there is less weight on the springs.
 Instability: Water surging inside large side tanks can cause the locomotive to become unstable and prone to derailment, as was the case with the LB&SCR L class 4-6-4T before they were modified.
 Axle loading limits a problem: For larger tank locomotives, it is hard to put much fuel and water aboard without requiring more axles than a rigid frame can handle.
 Limit of boiler diameter: The boiler and water tanks must fit within the loading gauge of the railway being run on. Above a certain diameter of boiler there is little or no room for water tanks to be added and still fit within the loading gauge.

Popularity 
Worldwide, tank engines varied in popularity. They were more common in areas where the length of run was short, and a quick turn around time was needed or turning facilities were not available, mostly in Europe. With their limited fuel and water capacity, they were not favoured in areas where long runs between stops were the norm.

They were very common in the United Kingdom, France, and Germany. In the United Kingdom, they were frequently used for shunting and piloting duties, suburban passenger services and local freight. The GWR was famous for its Prairie tanks (such as the "61xx" class), used for many things including very heavy trains on the Welsh valley coal mining lines that the GWR 4200 Class  were designed for. In Germany, too, large tank locomotives were built. In the United States they were used for push-pull suburban service, switching in terminals and locomotive shops, and in logging, mining and industrial service.

Preservation 

Tank locomotives are popular with heritage railways for a number of reasons. They are usually cheaper to purchase than a tender locomotive due to their smaller size, and cheaper to transport to heritage lines which are isolated from the national rail network. Many locomotives were bought from former industrial railways; more tank engines were available from this source, resulting in lower prices.

Most heritage railways are short and usually do not have turntables at both ends of the line. A tank locomotive has good visibility for the driver in both directions. As the trains being hauled are usually light, the tank locomotive is more fuel efficient than a large tender locomotive. The cost of maintaining the engine is lower, and there is less wear and tear on the track.

See also 
 Steam locomotive components

References 

 
Steam locomotive types